Characteristic set may refer to

 The characteristic set of an algebraic matroid
 The characteristic set of a linear matroid
 Wu's method of characteristic set